The Canadian American Business Council (CABC) is a non-profit, non-partisan, issues-oriented business organization that provides the private sector's perspective in the Canada-U.S. relationship. The Council hosts roundtables with Canadian and U.S. politicians, produces conferences, and recognizes one outstanding businessperson each year with its Corporate Leadership Award.  In January, 2022, the Ontario government named Scotty Greenwood, CABC's CEO, as one of ten members of Premier Doug Ford's Council on U.S. Trade and Industry Competitiveness.

Board of directors
The following companies are represented on the CABC Board of Directors.

Air Canada
Barrick Gold of North America
Baxter Corporation
Bennett Jones
Bombardier Inc.
Borden Ladner Gervais
Campbell Soup Company
Capitol Hill Consulting Group
CN
Coca-Cola Company
Contextere
Dickstein Shapiro LLP
Enbridge
Energy Equipment and Infrastructure Alliance
ExxonMobil
Facebook
Ford Motor Company
GE
Google
Harley-Davidson Canada
Johnson & Johnson
LockheedMartin
MasterCard Canada
Motion Picture Association - Canada
Revolution Organics
Rio Tinto
Shell Canada Ltd.
Spectra Energy
TD Bank Group
UPS Canada

Annual events
Spring Policy Summit (Washington, DC)
State of the Relationship Summit (Ottawa, Ontario)

CABC Corporate Leadership Award
The Corporate Leadership Award is awarded annually to a remarkable member of the Canadian-American business community. Past winners include, Coca-Cola Company Chief Sustainability Officer Bea Perez (2015), Campbell Soup Company President & CEO Denise Morrison (2014), United Technologies Chairman & CEO Louis Chenevert (2013).

References

Non-profit organizations based in Washington, D.C.